Devan Carroll (born August 23, 1988 in Jacksonville, North Carolina) is an American soccer player who previously played for the Wilmington Hammerheads in USL Pro as well as Myrtle Beach FC in National Premier Soccer League.

Career

College and Amateur
Devan Carroll played his high school career for White Oak High School in Jacksonville, North Carolina, going to three back-to-back state championship games only just to win his junior year. Also winning Championship Most Valuable Player for scoring three goals in the final game. Carroll tallied 107 goals in his four years at White Oak High.

Carroll played his collegiate soccer career at the University of North Carolina Wilmington, where he was CAA Player-of-the-Year, First-team All-CAA, First-team NSCAA South Atlantic and Third-team TopDrawer.com All-America, National Team of the Week, National Player of the Week, Thomas Moseley Outstanding Athlete Award, throughout the duration of his 2008 season. Carroll was also on the 2009 MAC Hermann Watch List.

Carroll played his PDL career for the Cary Clarets for the 2009 season.

Professional
Carroll signed his first professional contract on March 1, 2011 when he joined USL Pro club Wilmington Hammerheads.

References

External links
 UNCW profile

1988 births
Living people
American soccer players
UNC Wilmington Seahawks men's soccer players
Cary Clarets players
Wilmington Hammerheads FC players
USL League Two players
Soccer players from North Carolina
Association football forwards